Eddie Murphy Raw is a 1987 American stand-up comedy film starring Eddie Murphy and directed by Robert Townsend. It was Murphy's second feature stand-up comedy film, following Eddie Murphy Delirious. However, unlike Delirious, Raw received a wide theatrical release. The 90-minute show was filmed at the Felt Forum, a venue in the Madison Square Garden complex in New York City. The film was released in the United States on December 18, 1987. As of January 2022, it is the highest-grossing stand-up comedy concert film ever released, making $50.5 million in the United States and Canada.

Plot
The film opens with a pre-taped sketch depicting a scene from Murphy's childhood. At a family Thanksgiving in November 1968, the children take turns showing their talents to the assembled relatives (including one played by Murphy himself). Young Eddie (Deon Richmond) shocks the family with a rude joke about a monkey and a lion.

After emerging on stage for the live show, Murphy begins by discussing the angry reactions of celebrities parodied in his previous stand-up show, Delirious, specifically Mr. T and Michael Jackson, as well as homosexual viewers offended by his jokes about "faggots." Murphy then narrates a phone call he received from Bill Cosby chastising him for using profanity on stage. Angered by Cosby's assumption that his entire act was nothing but "filth flarn filth," Murphy calls Richard Pryor for advice. Pryor declares that his only concerns should be making audiences laugh and getting paid, and recommends that he tell Cosby to "Have a Coke and a smile and shut the fuck up." Murphy elaborates on his admiration for the "raw" comedy of Pryor, running through a routine from his own teenage years about defecation, in Pryor's voice. He then goes on to talk about how people who don't speak English only pick up the curse words in his act, and shout them at him on the street.

Next comes a lengthy routine about dating and relationships. Murphy explains that the rise of deadly sexually transmitted infections has motivated him to seek marriage, but the divorce of Johnny Carson and Joanna Holland (in which she sought 50% of his assets) has left him paranoid about the financial risk of marriage, concluding that "no pussy is worth $150 million." He mocks the aggression and materialism of American women (compared to his believed meekness of Japanese women), referring to the popularity of Janet Jackson's song "What Have You Done for Me Lately." He jokes that he intends to go deep into Africa to find a "bush bitch" who has no concept of Western culture... at least until American women convince her to stand up for herself and demand "HALF!" This develops into a broader warning to men to avoid "the pussy trap," and a warning to women that men never remain faithful — once a man has evoked a powerful orgasm from a woman ("ooohhhh!") she will tolerate all kinds of misbehavior, although she may pursue infidelity of her own.

The next segment narrates a childhood memory of his mother promising to cook him a hamburger "better than McDonald's," only to produce an unappealing "welfare burger," a lump of beef filled with onion and green peppers on Wonder Bread (while the neighborhood children show off their McDonald's hamburgers in a call-back to the ice cream segment of Delirious), but he states that as an adult, he has more of an appreciation of the tastiness of his mom's homemade dish.

Murphy then talks about white people out on the town, criticizing their embarrassing dance moves, leading onto Italian-Americans being inspired by Rocky, then culminates to a bit about fighting in a discotheque with Deney Terrio, eventually starting a large-scale brawl after which "everybody sued me" for millions of dollars.

After the fight, Murphy calls his parents, leading to a long impression of his drunken stepfather (another call-back to a popular bit from Delirious). This final segment runs for over 10 minutes and incorporates his stepfather's habit of misquoting Motown songs (including "Ain't Too Proud to Beg", which opened the film).

Cast (opening segment)
 Eddie Murphy as himself
 Tatyana Ali as Eddie's sister (sketch)
 Deon Richmond as Little Eddie (sketch)
 Billie Allen as Eddie's aunt (sketch)
 James Brown III as Thanksgiving guest
 Michelle Davison as Thanksgiving guest
 Leonard Jackson as Uncle Gus (sketch)
 Samuel L. Jackson as Eddie's Uncle
 Warren Morris as Poetry reader
 Basil Wallace as Eddie's Father (sketch)
 Damien Wayans as Child running in the house
 Ellis E. Williams as Eddie's Uncle (sketch)
 Carol Woods as Eddie's Aunt
 Kim Wayans as Interviewed fan (uncredited)

Rating 
The film was originally given an "X" rating by the MPAA, but several cuts from Murphy's performance were made to secure an "R" rating.

Records
The film surpassed Richard Pryor: Live on the Sunset Strip as the highest grossing concert film with a gross of $50.5 million.

The film contained the word "fuck" 223 times, setting the record for highest "fuck count" ever in a feature-length, theatrically released film at the time (surpassing Scarface). Raw held the record until 1990 before being surpassed by Goodfellas.

Critical reception
The New York Times praised Eddie Murphy's stand-up routine.

Michael Wilmington of the Los Angeles Times wrote that it was "a surprisingly poor concert film of Murphy’s stand-up act," saying Murphy is "like a musician with fabulous technique playing 'Chopsticks.'"

Tatyana Ali's The Fresh Prince of Bel-Air co-star Alfonso Ribeiro later claimed to have drawn inspiration from Murphy's depiction of white people dancing in developing "The Carlton" for his character Carlton Banks.

On Rotten Tomatoes, the film holds a rating of 77% from 22 reviews with the consensus: "Like its title suggests, Eddie Murphy Raw is a searingly unbridled and viciously funny showcase from one of comedy's best."

See also
 Eddie Murphy filmography

References

External links
 
 

1987 films
1987 comedy films
African-American comedy films
African-American films
Cultural depictions of Bill Cosby
Cultural depictions of Michael Jackson
Films directed by Robert Townsend
Films set in Manhattan
Films with screenplays by Eddie Murphy
Paramount Pictures films
Stand-up comedy concert films
1980s English-language films
1980s American films